Microoptomechanical systems (MOMS), also written as micro-optomechanical systems, are a special class of microelectromechanical systems (MEMS) which use optical and mechanical, but not electronic components.

See also
Microoptoelectromechanical systems (MOEMS)
Nanoelectromechanical systems (NEMS)

Microtechnology